T38 or T-38 may refer to:

 T38 (classification), a disability sport classification for disability athletics
 T.38, a standard for fax over IP
 T-38 tank, a Soviet light tank
 Allison T38, a turboprop aircraft engine
 Northrop T-38 Talon, a U.S. jet trainer
 Slingsby T.38 Grasshopper, a British training glider